Variant is a young adult suspense novel by Robison Wells. It was published on October 4, 2011 by HarperTeen. Wells has stated that the initial draft of Variant took him only eleven days to write. The book was named one of Publishers Weekly's "Best Books of 2011".

Plot
Variant is a book that follows the character of Benson Fisher as he is sent to Maxfield Academy on a scholarship. Benson is a seventeen-year-old foster, and hasn't stayed in a family for more than four and a half months. Because he is always switching families, he has no permanent friends; always known as the "new kid". To him, this is an opportunity to leave his unhappy life, and take on a hopeful new future. As soon as he arrives at school he sees two students: a girl and a boy, run after the car he came from. Not long after, Becky, his "tour guide" comes to give Benson a tour. From her, Benson learns that the two students were breaking the rule of attempting to escape the school. Rule breaking is not tolerated at all, and if someone broke a rule, they were sent to "detention". There were no teachers; the students taught themselves. Any kind of communication from the outside was blocked, and the school had their own internet. 
In order to survive, Benson must join one of the three groups on campus: Society, Havoc, and Variant. Often referred to as "gangs" by the students. Society, the largest group, were the ones who followed and reinforced the rules, keeping the school in order. Havoc, a little bigger than half of Society, were the ones who got their way with violence. The last group, Variant, which, by far was the smallest group. The variant was everybody else who wasn't in Society or Havoc, kind of like an "other" group. Benson quickly discovers that the groups are constantly at each other's throats and that it's a much more dangerous game than he had anticipated. Benson, not impressed by Society or Havoc, joins Variant. 
Benson learns that the school operated under a system of points, where the gangs do their jobs to earn more. If a person breaks a rule, its group loses points as part of the punishment; Points which could buy extra snacks, clothes, backpacks, etc.  
A couple of weeks into his new school, there is a school dance. Benson goes with Jane, another member of Variant. Benson takes an interest in her, but when they are talking outside on the night of the dance, Laura and Dylan, members of Society, comes and stops them. Dylan hits Benson and Jane with a pipe repeatedly, until both have fallen. Some few hours later that night, Benson wakes up and tries to wake Jane. Jane twitches, and afterward systematically walks to a door on the wall around the school. The door leads to a basement, with computers and labs. She walks to a computer, pulls off her ear and plugs a cable from the computer into her head. From this Benson learns that Jane, and possibly others, are not human, but androids. With no adults obviously present, it is everyone for themselves. The students are supervised by unknown people, communicating by videos and messages, but never in person. In order to survive, he must escape. Nothing is as it seems as he attempts to make it out of the school alive.

Reception
Critical reception for Variant was positive, with Kirkus Reviews praising the book's first person narrative. Publishers Weekly wrote that the book was "fast paced" and had a "clever premise". Voice of Youth Advocates stated that the book was "an exciting, edge-of-your-seat read" that "should join the ranks of today’s must-read science fiction and fantasy series". Booklist called Variant a "good old-fashioned paranoia taken to giddy extremes".

Fangoria gave the book two out of four skulls, saying "As much as I’m sure getting splattered by a 6 mm water soluble paint-pellet would sting to the high heavens, it doesn’t seem to carry the template of threat that THE HUNGER GAMES has already laid down for all other books to haplessly follow." The reviewer ended the review with "Once readers reach its subsequent sequels, those paint pellets may just end up being replaced with something a little more lethal—and original."

Awards
2011 Publishers Weekly Best Books of 2011

2011 Association for Mormon Letters Award for Best Young Adult Novel—WON

2011 Whitney Award for Best Youth Speculative Fiction—WON

2012-2013 Utah Beehive Awards for Young Adult—NOMINEE

2013 Missouri Truman Awards—NOMINEE

2013 South Carolina Young Adult Book Awards—NOMINEE

References

External links
 Official author site

American young adult novels
2011 American novels
American thriller novels
HarperCollins books